Since the proclamation of Independence on November 28, 1912, Albania has organized 11 population censuses. The first official census was conducted on November 15, 1923 and was restricted to a mere population count. Because knowledge about the age of the citizens was missing at the time, only the main population characteristics were collected. However, the censuses of 1923 and later 1930 made up the basis for setting up a kind of vital population register by age and gender.
From 1945 to 1960, the censuses followed more or less the same methodology. The most important objective of the 1945 census was to lay the basis for the civil population registry, the so called Population Fundamentals Book. These early censuses were all conducted by using a “freezing day” approach, i.e. no one was allowed to leave their home until the enumerator had completed the interview. During the time period from 1969–1989, the censuses continued to be conducted on the prerequisite that everyone needed to be present during the interview. The 1923–1960 censuses all collected general information on population characteristics to build up and to consolidate the civil population registry, while censuses conducted during the 1969–1989 period had more elaborate questionnaires with questions related to the socio-economic characteristics of the population. At that time, differences between the civil registration data and the population census were minor due to the absence of migration. The recent Population and Housing Censuses of 2001–2011 were carried out in compliance with international recommendations from Eurostat and the UNECE statistical division.

National censuses

Notes 
- In the 2011 census, 21,839 respondents declined to participate.

See also 
 Demographics of Albania
 INSTAT

References